Mehendigonj is an Upazila of Barisal District in the Division of Barisal, Bangladesh. Mehendigonj is popularly known as Patarhat by the local people.

Geography

It has 55,128 households and a total area of 435.79 km2.
The river Meghna is surrounded by this small island causing erosion every year during the monsoon season. The popular towns such as Ulania, Kaliganj in the east are in serious danger. About 9,480 people composing 1,343 families have become homeless due to erosion.

Mehendigonj has a history of its own in education and culture, trade and commerce, agriculture and artistry. But the Meghna, the Tentulia and the Mashkata have become the 'fait accompli' of three lakh people of the upazila. The rivers have already swallowed most of the areas of several unions including Gubindapur, Jagalia, Darirchar-Khajuria, Bhashanchar and Andermanik.

There is a documentary titled Mehendigonj of Barisal at Estuary of Meghna based on river erosion directed by Fuad Chowdhury. The documentary portrays the severity of river erosion in monsoon season (July–September). Only in 2007,  of land was engulfed by the river Meghna, making around forty thousand people landless, especially affecting women's privacy and security. Hardly any initiative can be seen to rehabilitate these affected people and to stop the river erosion. Local people are helping each other with their limited resources.
In the last 300 years, the feudal landlord (Jamidars) of Ulania of Mehendigonj built an estate of 100 buildings which are also under the threat of Meghna erosion.

Demographics
According to the 2011 Bangladesh census, Mehendigonj had a population of 301,046. Males constituted 146,926 of the population, and females 154,120. Mehendigonj had an average literacy rate of 48.57% (7+ years), against the national average of 56.1%.

Administration
Mehendigonj thana was turned into an upazila in 1983. 

Mehendiganj Upazila is divided into Mehendiganj Municipality and 16 union parishads: Alimabad, Andharmanik, Bhasanchar, Bidyanandapur, Chandpur, Char Ekkaria, Char Gopalpur, Dakshin Ulania, Darichar Khajuria, Gobindapur, Jangalia, Joynagar, Lata, Mehendiganj, Sreepur, and Uttar Ulania. The union parishads are subdivided into 115 mauzas and 142 villages.

Notable residents
 Asad Chowdhury, poet, resides in Mehendiganj.
 Abdul Gaffar Choudhury, journalist and author of the lyrics to Amar Bhaier Rokte Rangano, was born at Ulania in 1934.

See also
Upazilas of Bangladesh
Districts of Bangladesh
Divisions of Bangladesh

References

 
Upazilas of Barisal District
Barishal Division